Rape laws vary across the United States jurisdictions. However, rape is federally defined (even though individual state definitions may differ) for statistical purposes as:

Terminology 
Laws use various terms to define aspects of instances of rape or sexual assault, including the acts themselves, the alleged perpetrator and the alleged victim, and whether they are or have been married to each other or someone else.
 Penetrative acts: 
 rape, or carnal knowledge (generally vaginal, sometimes also anal or oral)
 sodomy, unnatural intercourse, or crime against nature (only anal, generally between two men, sometimes also a man to a woman)
 sexual abuse (when an accuser was incapable of consenting due to age, or otherwise in an unequal power relation with the accused)
 sexual assault (can also be non-penetrative)
 sexual battery
 sexual intercourse or (mis)conduct (generally vaginal, sometimes also oral and anal)
 deviate sexual intercourse or (mis)conduct (only oral and anal, sometimes any form of sexual intercourse with animals)
 infamous crime against nature (only oral and anal, and any form of sexual intercourse with animals; unclear whether it prohibits non-penetrative cunnilingus)
 Non-penetrative acts: indecent contact, sexual assault (can also be penetrative)
 Accused: accused, actor, author, defendant, (alleged) perpetrator, person, suspect 
 Accuser: accuser, complainant, person, the other person, (alleged) victim  
 Husband (male) or wife (female): spouse, spousal or marital (adjective)

Furthermore, each state or federal agency may define sexual consent differently, if they do so at all. Some may only define the circumstances in which a person is incapable of consenting, and assume implied consent on a person in every other situation. They often require said person to resist any unwanted sexual advances, or that these advances only become criminal when the accused can be shown to have used some kind of force or coercion (which the accuser was incapable of resisting – though this is not always required) to commit the unwanted sexual advances upon the accuser. Other U.S. states and federal agencies afford each person voluntary, freely given or affirmative consent, which must first be obtained by someone else before being allowed to have sex with said person, and that this consent can be revoked at any time by said person.

Federal

Civilian
Federal law applies in Federal areas and in cases of displacement between States:

Military

The United States military has an offense of rape and another of sodomy. The Uniform Code of Military Justice (UCMJ) of the United States Armed Forces regards sex without consent as rape or sexual assault; it provides a definition of consent and examples of illegitimate inferrals of consent in § 920. Art. 120. "Rape and sexual assault generally" (g) 7 and 8.

District of Columbia
In the District of Columbia, "sexual act" means "sexual intercourse".

States

Some U.S. states recognize penetrative sex without consent by the victim and without the use of force by the perpetrator as a crime (usually called 'rape'). Other states do not recognize this as a crime; their laws stipulate that the perpetrator must have used some kind of force or coercion (physical violence (that results in demonstrable physical injury), threats against the victim or a third party, or some other form of coercion) in order for such nonconsensual penetrative sex to amount to a crime. Similarly, some states recognize non-penetrative sex acts (contact such as fondling or touching a person's intimate parts, or exposure of a body or sexual activity) without consent by the victim and without the use of force by the perpetrator as a crime, while other states do not.

Alabama 

Alabama divide its dispositions against forced sexual intercourse in sodomy and rape; in addition, the crime of "sexual torture" describes "rape by instrumentation".

Alaska

Arizona
Arizona sentencing laws make the prison term dependent on several factors such as the age of the victim or the criminal record of the offender.

Arkansas
Source:

California
California separates rape, sodomy and rape by instrumentation.

All crimes listed here are also punishable by California’s “One-Strike Law”, Penal Code 667.61, which has a list of aggravating circumstances (such as a prior sex crime conviction, or the employment of torture during the crime), which if the aggravating circumstance is found true, increases the base term to a life sentence with parole eligibility depending on the age of the victim and the number of aggravating circumstances found true. (Although dependent on the facts of the case, parole eligibility will either be set at 15 years served, 25 years served, or in extreme cases life without the possibility of parole.)

As of October 2021, the spousal rape section was repealed by the Legislature. Spousal rape is now prosecuted the same as other rape charges.

Colorado
Sexual assault describes rape in the law of Colorado, and several factors make this crime, normally classified as class 3 felony, to be punished more harshly.

Connecticut
Source:

Delaware
In Delaware, rape is divided in four degrees.

Florida
In Florida, rape is denominated "sexual battery." Of note, the offense of capital sexual battery cover cases where the offender is above 18 and the victim below 12.

Section 794.011 of the Florida Statutes defines "consent" as 'intelligent, knowing, and voluntary consent and does not include coerced submission. "Consent" shall not be deemed or construed to mean the failure by the alleged victim to offer physical resistance to the offender.' Any sexual act performed on a person without their freely given or affirmative consent is punishable as 'sexual battery' to various degrees (depending on the perpetrator's and victim's ages, and whether no, some, or potentially deadly physical force or coercion was used).

Georgia
In Georgia, the offense of rape is consolidated in only one offense, and a separate charge of sodomy has been defined.

Hawaii
In Hawaii, the offense of sexual assault has been divided in three degrees.

Idaho
Idaho defines, besides classical rape, marital rape.

Illinois
In Illinois, the term of "criminal sexual assault" is used to describe what would be termed rape in the usual language.

According to the 2012 Criminal Code of the Illinois Compiled Statutes, Section 720 ILCS 5/11-1.70, "consent" is 'a freely given agreement to the act of sexual penetration or sexual conduct in question. Lack of verbal or physical resistance or submission by the victim resulting from the use of force or threat of force by the accused shall not constitute consent. The manner of dress of the victim at the time of the offense shall not constitute consent. A person who initially consents to sexual penetration or sexual conduct is not deemed to have consented to any sexual penetration or sexual conduct that occurs after he or she withdraws consent during the course of that sexual penetration or sexual conduct.' However, the lack of consent is not sufficient to prosecute anyone for a sex crime (except in very specific cases in which the victim is deemed incapable of consenting, namely Section 11-1.20 (a)(2), Section 11-1.50.(a)(2), Section 11-9.2.(e), and Section 11-9.5.(c)), making Illinois' rape legislation coercion-based (Section 11-1.20 (a)(1)).

Indiana
In Indiana, there is only one separate disposition for the crime of rape, on which, if needed, are applied aggravating circumstances.

Iowa
In Iowa, there are three degrees of rape.

Kansas
In addition to the different categories of statutory rape, there is one category of rape in Kansas.

Kentucky
The law in Kentucky separates rape and sodomy, both divided into three degrees.

Louisiana
Louisiana has divided the offense of rape into three degrees.

Its capital child rape status was overturned by the Supreme Court in Kennedy v. Louisiana.

Maine
In Maine, rape is denominated "Gross Sexual Assault."

Maryland
In Maryland, rape, divided into two degrees, is restricted to non-consented vaginal penetration while sexual offenses, divided in four degrees, include sexual acts in the two first degrees, here defined by any forced penetration.

Massachusetts
Several different statutes define rape in Massachusetts.

Michigan
In Michigan, the offense of rape is contained into the offenses of Criminal Sexual Conduct.

Minnesota
In Minnesota the offense is divided into five degrees, of which the first three cover rape.

Until July 2019, in Minnesota sexual violence occurring between spouses at the time they cohabit or between unmarried partners could be prosecuted only if there was force or threat of thereof, due to exemptions created by Article 609.349 'Voluntary relationships' which stipulated that certain sexual offenses do not apply to spouses (unless they are separated), and neither do they apply to unmarried cohabitants. These are offenses that deal with situations where the lack of consent is due to the incapacity of consent of the victim, including where the victim was drugged by the perpetrator. These situations, which were excluded from prosecution, are where the victim was "mentally impaired, mentally incapacitated, or physically helpless". The term "mentally incapacitated" is defined as a person who "under the influence of alcohol, a narcotic, anesthetic, or any other substance, administered to that person without the person's agreement, lacks the judgment to give a reasoned consent to sexual contact or sexual penetration". (see Article 609.341 for definitions). In 2019, these exemptions were repealed.

In 2021 the Minnesota Supreme Court ruled that people who drink alcohol or take drugs of their own free will before being sexually assaulted do not meet the Minnesota legislature’s definition of mentally incapacitated.

Mississippi
Several disparate statutes are appliable to the crime of rape.

Missouri
In Missouri, both rape and statutory rape, along with sodomy, are divided into two degrees.

Montana
In Montana rape is denominated Sexual Intercourse Without Consent.

Nebraska
In Nebraska the first degrees of several sex offenses cover cases of rape.

Nevada
In Nevada, the offense of rape is denominated Sexual Assault.

New Hampshire
In New Hampshire, rape is denominated Sexual Assault.

New Jersey
In New Jersey, rape is covered as Aggravated Sexual Assault in the First Degree.

New Mexico
In New Mexico the offense of rape is punished as Criminal Sexual Penetration, itself divided in four degrees.

New York
In New York the crime of rape and Criminal Sexual Act are divided in three degrees; moreover, the offense of "Sexual Misconduct" describes any sexual act done without the victim's consent.

Sexual offenses are defined as 'sexual [acts] committed without consent of the victim'. Lack of consent results from 4 possible causes: forcible compulsion, incapacity to consent, the victim not expressly or implicitly acquiescing (in sexual abuse and forcible touching cases), or expression of lack of consent (in sexual intercourse and sexual oral or anal conduct cases). Consent itself is not defined; Section 130.5 of the New York Penal Law only stipulates that a person who doesn't want to have sex needs to be clear enough in their words and acts, so that 'a reasonable person in the actor's situation would have understood such person's words and acts as an expression of lack of consent to such act under all the circumstances'. This description doesn't make clear whether affirmative consent is required to have sex (or conversely, whether a lack of affirmative consent can result in a sexual offense), but both Section 130.25 Rape in the third degree (3) and Section 130.40 Criminal sexual act in the third degree (3) do provide this possibility in the form of catch-all clauses by stating that, whenever there is a 'lack of consent (...) by reason of some factor other than incapacity to consent', this is sufficient for the sexual act to amount to a crime.

North Carolina
In North Carolina, the offenses of Rape and Sexual Offense cover cases of forced penetration.

The Constitution of North Carolina ranks rape among the crimes which can be punished by death, although Kennedy v. Louisiana restricts the range of capital crimes to homicides and crimes against the State.

North Dakota
In North Dakota, rape is defined as Gross Sexual Imposition, although several other crimes describe cases of statutory rape.

Ohio
In Ohio, the offenses of Rape and Sexual Battery are relevant to this article.

Oklahoma
Oklahoma divides the offense of rape in two degrees and enacted a capital version of the Jessica's Law.

Oregon
In Oregon, both rape and sodomy are divided in three degrees, and the crime of Unlawful Sexual Penetration is divided in two degrees.

Pennsylvania
In Pennsylvania, the offenses of rape, involuntary deviate sexual intercourse and sexual assault cover what could be commonly called rape.

In the Pennsylvania Consolidated Statutes, 'Section 3107. Resistance not required' stipulates that 'the alleged victim need not resist the actor in prosecutions under this chapter'. The Statutes do not define consent, but if an actor engages in sexual intercourse or deviate sexual intercourse, or aggravated indecent assault, with a complainant without the latter's consent, this makes the actor punishable under 'Section 3124.1. Sexual assault', or 'Section 3125. Aggravated indecent assault', respectively. Furthermore, mental disability can render a person incapable of consenting to sexual intercourse, deviate sexual intercourse, or aggravated indecent assault, thus making an actor who engages in these acts with a mentally disabled complainant punishable under 'Section 3121. Rape', 'Section 3123. Involuntary deviate sexual intercourse', or 'Section 3125. Aggravated indecent assault', respectively.

Rhode Island
In Rhode Island, the three degrees of Sexual Assault and the first degree of Child Molestation Sexual Assault are relevant to this article.

South Carolina
South Carolina divides "criminal sexual conduct" in three degrees, along two categories of teacher-student sex and a special crime for spousal rape.

South Dakota
In South Dakota, there is four degrees to the crime of rape.

Tennessee
In Tennessee the law distinguishes between Rape and Aggravated Rape, along with some dispositions on statutory rape.

Texas
In Texas, rape is described as Sexual Assault.

Section 22.011 (a) defines sexual assault as an actor performing various forms of sexual penetration of another person's body without that person's consent. Section 22.011 (b) implies that a person's consent is always present, except in 12 specified circumstances that render a person incapable of consenting, such as being forced or coerced with violence or threats by the actor (possibly because of the unequal power balance between the actor and the other person), unconscious or 'physically unable to resist', or having a 'mental disease or defect'. Although Subsection (b)(3) and (4) could be interpreted as requiring the other person to resist the sexual assault, in the 2016 Orgain v. State case the Second District Court of Appeals ruled that sexual assault is defined by the attacker's use of force or coercion, not by the victim's resistance. Texas sexual assault law is therefore coercion-based: the actor requires no freely given consent or affirmative consent from the other person, and the other person cannot freely revoke their implied permanent consent, unless they can satisfy one of the 12 specified circumstances. In other words: if the other person claims not to have wanted to have sex with the actor, but cannot be demonstrated to have been incapable of consenting, and the actor cannot be demonstrated to have used some kind of force or coercion, it is not sexual assault under Texas state law.

Utah
Utah has several laws regarding rape, rape by objects and statutory rape.

Vermont
In Vermont, rape is denominated Sexual Assault.

Virginia
In Virginia, there is a single offense of Rape along with Forcible Sodomy and various forms of Carnal Knowledge.

Washington

In Washington, there is three degrees for the offenses of Rape and Rape of a Child, and two degrees for Sexual Misconduct with a Minor.

West Virginia
In West Virginia, the offense of rape, denominated as "Sexual Assault" and "Sexual Abuse" both divided in three degrees.

Wisconsin
In Wisconsin, main sex offenses, denominated Sexual Assault, are divided in four degrees, and the three first degrees cover cases of penetration.

Additional offenses cover cases of sexual exploitation on vulnerable persons.

Wyoming
In Wyoming, rape, denominated there Sexual Assault, is divided in three degrees, and statutory rape, denominated Sexual Abuse of a Minor, is divided in four degrees, the three first involving penetration.

Territory

American Samoa 
The laws of American Samoa distinguished between rape, sexual assault, sodomy and deviate sexual assault.

Guam 
In Guam, the law distinguishes between four degrees of criminal sexual conduct, the three first involving penetration.

Northern Mariana Islands 
In the Commonwealth of the Northern Mariana Islands, the offense of Sexual assault is divided in four degrees, of which the three first involve penetration.

Puerto Rico 
In Puerto Rico, there is only the crime of Sexual Assault (Agresión sexual)

Virgin Islands 
In the American Virgin Islands, the offense of rape is divided in three degrees, and a separate offense of Aggravated rape is further divided in two degrees.

Notes and references

Notes

References

External links

 

United States law-related lists
Rape in the United States